Viktor Ivanovich Ilyin (Russian: Ви́ктор Ива́нович Ильи́н; born 26 December 1947) is a Soviet Army deserter who, at the rank of second lieutenant, attempted to assassinate the Soviet leader, Leonid Brezhnev on 22 January 1969 in Moscow.

Biography
Ilyin was born in Leningrad on 26 December 1947. He was less than two years old when he was taken away from his alcoholic parents and grew up in a foster family.

He entered a topographical technical school and desired to become a geologist. However, after travelling to many different regions, a "depressing impression" was left on him of "poverty, drunkenness, devastation" - different to what Soviet television showed. As a result, he drafted a reform plan which included a monthly payment to each citizen from natural resource sales, which he sent to the Kremlin, but did not receive a response. He said that was when he decided to kill Brezhnev so that everyone would know of his ideas, where he planned to speak about his plan in court. He spent almost a year preparing to assassinate him and joined the army after graduation to gain access to weapons. 

He was distressed by the Soviet invasion of Czechoslovakia in 1968, and had questioned local ideology officials about the Prague Spring.

When Ilyin was on duty, he stole two Makarov guns and four magazines from his army unit's safe and went to Moscow. Ilyin spent a day with his uncle, a Soviet police worker, and stole his uniform before going to Red Square. He went to the Kremlin, and looked for the best firing position, choosing a place a few metres from the entrance gate. When the motorcade entered the gates of Borovitskaya Tower, carrying cosmonauts and top Soviet leaders, Ilyin fired his pistols at the second vehicle that he thought was carrying Leonid Brezhnev. However, the vehicle was occupied by the cosmonauts Georgy Beregovoy, Alexei Leonov, Andrian Nikolaev, and Valentina Tereshkova. A bullet killed the limousine driver Ilya Zharkov who was driving as a substitute on his last day before retirement. Beregovoy was wounded, and Vasiliy Zatsipilin, who was part of the motorcycle escort, was also hit, but was able to aim his motorcycle at Ilyin, bringing him down. The guards were able to take control, as Ilyin suffered a seizure. 

Yuri Andropov, head of the KGB, personally questioned Ilyin. During his interrogation, the recording of which was found in the Russian State Archives after 1991, Ilyin told Andropov that his motivation to assassinate Brezhnev was to have him replaced with his Second Secretary and Party Ideologue Mikhail Suslov (whom Ilyin called "the most outstanding person in the party at the moment"). Whether this was true or if he was simply trying to provoke infighting within the Politburo remains unknown. He was facing the death penalty, but after an investigation, he was considered insane and was placed in a mental hospital in solitary confinement for 20 years. 

In 1990, he was set free, following a Supreme Court ruling.

See also
Attempted assassination of Leonid Brezhnev

References

1947 births
Living people
Failed assassins
Soviet people
Soviet Army officers
Soviet assassins
Deserters
Prisoners and detainees of the Soviet Union